Alexander Mikhailovich may refer to:
 Grand Prince Aleksandr Mikhailovich of Tver (1301 – 1339)
 Grand Duke Alexander Mikhailovich of Russia (1866 – 1933)